Heiric of Auxerre (841–876) was a French Benedictine theologian and writer.

He was an oblate of the monastery of St. Germanus of Auxerre from a young age. He studied with Servatus Lupus and Haymo of Auxerre. His own students included Remigius of Auxerre and Hucbald.

His Miracula sancti Germani was a verse life of St. Germanus. Other works include his Collectaeum, a homiliary, and glosses on the Categoriae decem.

Notes

External links
 
 Chapter on the School of Auxerre from The History of Philosophy by William Turner, 1903.
 Heiric of Auxerre's labyrinth

841 births
876 deaths
9th-century Latin writers
Writers from the Carolingian Empire
French Benedictines
Medieval French theologians
9th-century people from West Francia
9th-century Christian theologians
Benedictine theologians